LKR may refer to:

 Sri Lankan rupee by ISO 4217 currency code
 LKR (TV series) or Life Ka Recharge, an Indian comedy show
 Liberal-Konservative Reformer (LKR), a German political party
 Little Kids Rock (LKR), an American charitable organization 
 Las Khorey Airport, Somalia IATA airport code
 LKR, vehicle registration code for Kraśnik County, Poland
 LKR, ICAO airline designator for Laker Airways
 LKR, station code for Lakhisarai Junction railway station in Bihar, India
 LKR, FAA LID code for Lancaster County Airport, South Carolina, United States
 lkr, ISO 639 code for the Päri language of South Sudan